The 2012–13 TFF First League, also known as PTT First League) due to sponsoring reasons (in Turkish: PTT 1. Lig, is the 12th season since the league was established in 2001 and 50th season of the second-level football league of Turkey since its establishment in 1963–64. The start date of the league was 25 August 2012 and end date is 12 May 2013.

Teams
Manisaspor, Ankaragücü and Samsunspor relegated from Süper Lig. Akhisar Belediyespor, Elazığspor and Kasımpaşa promoted to 2012–13 Süper Lig.

1461 Trabzon, Şanlıurfaspor and Adana Demirspor promoted from TFF Second League. İstanbul Güngörenspor, Sakaryaspor and Giresunspor relegated to 2012–13 TFF Second League.

League table

Positions by round

Results

Promotion playoffs

The teams ranked fourth through seventh will compete in the promotion playoffs for the 2013–14 Süper Lig. The 4th team and 7th teams will play two matches in their own grounds. Likewise the 5th and 6th teams will play two mathes elimination round. This round is named as semi-finals. Winning teams will play one final match at a neutral venue. The winner of the final will be the third team to promote to Süper Lig 2013–2014. 3rd-placed team 1461 Trabzon is Süper Lig side Trabzonspor's reserve team So They Were Ineligible For Promotion And their play-off spot went to 7th-placed team Adana Demirspor.

Semi-finals 4-7

Semi-finals 5–6

Final

Season statistics

Top goalscorers

Top assists

Yellow cards

Red cards

References

See also
 2012–13 Turkish Cup
 2012–13 Süper Lig
 2012–13 TFF Second League
 2012–13 TFF Third League

TFF First League seasons
Turkey
1